Honey to the B is the debut album by English pop singer Billie Piper, released in 1998. Known mononymously as Billie until her second album, she was the first and youngest British female artist to have a first single enter the UK singles chart at number one.

A number of hit singles were released from the album, including "Girlfriend", "She Wants You", the anthemic "Because We Want To", and the title track "Honey to the Bee". "Honey to the Bee" was later covered by the Swedish girl group Play on their 2003 album Replay. The American version of the album differs in that it contains the radio mix of "Girlfriend". The single "Honey to the Bee" re-entered the official UK Singles Chart at number 17 on 21 January 2007, eight years after initial release, thanks to efforts by the BBC Radio 1 DJ Chris Moyles.

The album has sold 380,000 copies in the UK as of July 2013.

Track listing

Personnel
Billie Piper – vocals
Jim Marr – producer, mixing, programming, keyboards, guitar, bass guitar
Wendy Page – producer, mixing, backing vocals, vocal arrangement
Cutfather – producer, remixing
Yak Bondy – backing vocals, keyboards, piano, vocoder, programming
Roger Jackson – guitar, keyboards, programming
Mark James – acoustic guitar
Nick Lacey – flute, strings
London Community Gospel Choir – backing vocals
Sweet-P – vocals
Pete Craigie – engineer, mixing
Michelle Barry – assistant engineer
Matt Tait – assistant engineer

Charts

Weekly charts

Year-end charts

Certifications

Release history

References

1998 debut albums
Billie Piper albums
Virgin Records albums